Leafly is a website focused on cannabis use and education. The company says it has more than 120 million annual visitors and over 10 million monthly active users. Leafly provides a wide range of information on cannabis, including 1.5 million consumer product reviews, more than 9,000 cannabis articles and resources, and over 5,000 verified strains in its database. Leafly additionally provides 4,500+ retailers and 8,000+ cannabis brands with e-commerce tools such as digital storefronts, embedded menus, point-of-sale integrations, targeted advertising, and more. The company is headquartered in Seattle, Washington and from 2012 to 2019 was owned by Privateer Holdings, a private equity firm focused on the emerging legal cannabis industry. Leafly is now a wholly independent company with 160 employees.

History
Leafly was founded in June 2010 by Scott Vickers, Brian Wansolich, and Cy Scott. The three Orange County engineers recognized the need for a legitimate strain resource and began to build Leafly as a side project to their jobs as web developers. Privateer Holdings acquired the company in 2011, at which time Brendan Kennedy became the company's CEO. Meanwhile, the original founders left to launch a new company named Headset. By July 2011 the website had received about 180,000 unique visitors and was growing at 30 percent per month. In April 2012, Leafly reported about 2.3 million monthly visits and approximately 50,000 mobile app downloads per month. In June 2016, the company announced that it received more than 6 million monthly visitors and 31 million page views across its website and mobile applications.  On August 2, 2014, Leafly became the first cannabis company to place an advertisement in The New York Times.

Leadership 
On November 6, 2017, Privateer Holdings announced the appointment of Chris Jeffery as CEO; he was formerly  co-founder of food delivery service  OrderUp,  He was replaced  in 2018, .

On March 4, 2019, the firm appointed former vice president of Amazon Prime Video International Tim Leslie as its CEO.  He was replaced on August 18, 2020 by Yoko Miyashita, formerly the firm's General Counsel.

Business model
Leafly generates revenue by selling online display advertising and priority listing packages to companies in the cannabis industry. Display advertising campaigns are sold on a Cost Per Impression model. More than 4.5 million orders are placed with businesses on Leafly each year, generating $460 million in gross merchandise value (GMV) annually for Leafly partnered retailers.

Use
Leafly has three primary functions:

Strain explorer
Patients and consumers use Leafly to search for cannabis strains according to medical use, such as anxiety or nausea, and desired effects, like euphoria or creativity. Relevant strains are then presented in a format similar to the periodic table. The table is color coded to identify whether the strain is sativa, indica, or a hybrid of both.

Dispensary locator
Patients can use their zip codes or city and state names to search for dispensaries, which are then displayed on a map of the area. The dispensary profiles include menus, reviews, photos, and store locations.

Reviews
Leafly users can write reviews of strains and products they have tried or dispensaries they have visited. For dispensaries and products, reviews consist of a brief comment section and a star rating system that is based on medication, service, and atmosphere. Strain reviews include desirable effects, attributes, and summary information.

Mobile access
Leafly has mobile applications for iOS and Android devices. In 2021, the company launched a new iOS app that enables iPhone and iPad users to place pickup orders for cannabis in legal state markets.

Statistics
 220 million annual sessions
10+ million monthly active users

 5,000+ strains in the Leafly database, sorted alphabetically and categorized by indica, sativa, and hybrid
 1.5 million product reviews
 9,000+ cannabis articles and resources
 4,500+ retailers online with Leafly
 8,000+ brands online with Leafly
 4.5 million orders placed annually
 $460 million GMV

References

External links
 

American review websites
Cannabis websites
Cannabis media in the United States
Cannabis in Washington (state)